Mount Hooker is the name of several mountains worldwide:

Mount Hooker (Antarctica)
Mount Hooker (Canada), a mountain on the Continental Divide and border between British Columbia and Alberta, Canada
Hooker and Brown, mythical mountains alleged to exist in the Canadian Rockies
Mount Hooker (New Zealand) in the Southern Alps
Mount Hooker (Wyoming), United States